The 1998 Australian Sports Sedan Championship was a CAMS sanctioned motor racing title for drivers of Group 2D Sports Sedans. It was the 14th Australian Sports Sedan Championship to be awarded by CAMS.

Calendar
The championship was contested over a five round series.
 Round 1, Oran Park, New South Wales, 5 April
 Round 2, Oran Park, New South Wales, 14 June
 Round 3, Oran Park, New South Wales, 2 August
 Round 4, Mallala Motor Sport Park, South Australia, 23 August
 Round 5, Oran Park, New South Wales, 1 November

Rounds were contested over three races.

Points system
Championship points were awarded on a 10–9–8–7–6–5–4–3–2–1 basis for the first ten positions attained in qualifying at each round .
No points were awarded for Race 1, however the results were used to determine the starting grid for Race 2.
Championship points were awarded on a 21–19–17–16–15–14–13–12–11–10 basis for the first ten positions in both Race 2 and Race 3 of each round.

Results

References

National Sports Sedan Series
Sports Sedan Championship